For other uses, see IQ (disambiguation).

Oleg Verov, better known by his stage name AIKU (formerly IQ), is a Russian rap artist, musician and blogger. He is known for his fusion of reggae and rap.

Career 
Oleg was born in Moscow in the Otradnoye district. He began rapping in the late 1990s, recording his first track in 1998. In 2001, together with Leo Dee, he founded the White Shadows group. The musicians made all the recordings on their own, distributed them on cassettes and disks. In 2003, the album "White Shadows" was released, but later the team broke up.

In 2010, IQ began working on his solo album O-Street. As conceived by the rapper, it had to be “only classic pumping hip-hop." Soon the first video clips for the singles from the album appeared: "O-Street", "Consciousness" and "Secret". In 2011-12, the artist appeared at various concerts: at the MIR festival, in Moscow clubs Izvestia Hall and 16 tons, in Hamburg at the Hip Hop Academy. 

As a result, "O-Street" was released on May 28, 2013. It included 19 tracks, the work on the album lasted for 3 years. The disc is designed as a color 10-page comic by Cap Art. In support, clips were shot: "School" and "Outro". Among the guests on the plastic were Fuze, Marat, Panda, Check, BMB, Vitek, Korob and former bandmate Leo Dee. IQ expressed dismay due to the low public recognition the album received, arguing it was because of the album's classical sound. 

In 2015, IQ became a participant in the television rap competition Beats & Vibes. 

In 2017, AIKU began to collaborate with the label "Istoria Music", which was founded in 2016 by rapper ST. 

In 2019, he participated in the documentary film about the Russian hip-hop community, "BEEF," directed by Russian rapper Roma Zhigan. He appeared alongside other rappers like Jacques Anthony, Husky, and Oxxxymiron.

Oleg visited with solo performances in various cities - St. Petersburg, Chelyabinsk, Kazan, Tarkhankut, Sevastopol, Almaty. In 2017, he performed at the "Snow Party" in the Olympic Sports Complex with ST . In 2018, he performed at the FIFA Fan Fest in Moscow and Sochi, a hugely popular event.

Discography

White Shadows 

 2003 - White shadows

Studio Albums 

 2013 - O-STREET
 2016 - Four Sides EP
 2017 - Antagonist
 2021 - Another EP

Collaborative Albums 

 2009 - Levpravhop (together with the artists of the LevPravZvuk label)
 2009 - The Most Magical Flow (with YG)

Singles 

 2011 - O Street
 2011 - Secret
 2013 - Impact (with Sadat X , Leo Dee)
 2016 - Silk
 2016 - Everest
 2016 - Curtain (together with ST )
 2017 - Magic Night
 2017 - Grew up and Became a Rapper
 2017 - Can't See Them (with ST , Nasled & Lars)
 2017 - Your Name (with Nasled & Lars)

 2022 - Uno Dos Tres (with Massimo)
 2022 - Para Minute (with Racoona)
 2023  - Fake Love [to be released]

Filmography 
 2008 - "The Most Magical Flow"
 2009 - Choose Yourself
 2011 - "O-Street"
 2011 - "Consciousness"
 2011 - "Secret"
 2013 - "School"
 2013 - Outro
 2013 - "Impact" ft. Sadat X (Brand Nubian), Leo Dee
 2015 - "Centrifuge" ft. Check, Miko
 2017 - Bullet
 2017 - "Move on" ft. ST
 2017 - "We do not see them" ft. ST , Nasled & Lars
 2019 - "Drops" ft. Jay Mar
 2019 - "On Emotions"
 2020 - "Berries"
 2020 - "Piranha"

References 

Russian rappers
Russian hip hop
Russian hip hop musicians
1987 births
Living people